The central lobule is a small square lobule, situated in the anterior cerebellar notch. It overlaps the lingula, from which it is separated by the precentral fissure; laterally, it extends along the upper and anterior part of each hemisphere, where it forms a wing-like prolongation (ala), on each side, as the alae of the central lobule or alae lobuli centralis.

Additional Images

References

External links
 
 https://web.archive.org/web/20080614064333/http://www.ib.amwaw.edu.pl/anatomy/atlas/image_06e.htm
 https://web.archive.org/web/20010514005529/http://www.ib.amwaw.edu.pl/anatomy/atlas/image_11e.htm
 NIF Search - Central Lobule via the Neuroscience Information Framework